The Cambridge Home for the Aged and Infirm is an historic building on 650 Concord Avenue in Cambridge, Massachusetts.   Built in 1928 by the city, it is one of the oldest surviving municipal facilities for the housing of elderly and incurably ill patients, rather than indigents.  It is now operated as Neville Place, an assisted living community managed by Senior Living Residences.  The building was built in 1928 by Charles Reggio Greco and added to the National Register of Historic Places in 2002.

Description and history
The Cambridge Home for the Aged and Infirm is set on the south side of Concord Avenue, between it and the north shore of Fresh Pond in the western part of the city.  The main building is a 2-1/2 story Georgian Revival brick structure, roughly in the shape of a W.  It has a central main block, which is flanked on either side by wings that are essentially Y-shaped with a truncated stem.  The frame of the structure is reinforced concrete, which is faced in brick.  The main entrance is framed by a cast stone pedimented pavilion, with a keystone arch flanked by Doric columns.

The home was built in 1928 as a partial replacement for service that had previously been offered at the city's almshouse, and represents the first known instance of such a purpose-built facility in the state.  The older facility had primarily been built to house able-bodied yet indigent people, and had been judged functionally obsolete as much as 15 years before this facility was built.  This facility was designed by Charles Reggio Greco, a local architect who had produced designs for other municipal facilities.  It remained the city's primary support for its aged and infirm population until the advent of Medicare in the 1960s.  It then underwent conversion to a nursing home, and was again adapted for use as an assisted living facility in 1984.

See also
National Register of Historic Places listings in Cambridge, Massachusetts

References

Buildings and structures in Cambridge, Massachusetts
Residential buildings on the National Register of Historic Places in Massachusetts
National Register of Historic Places in Cambridge, Massachusetts